The 4 x 400 metres relay at the 1987 World Championships in Athletics was held at the Stadio Olimpico on September 5 and September 6.

Medals

Note: * Indicates athletes who ran in preliminary rounds.

Records
Existing records at the start of the event.

Results
All times shown are in seconds.

Final

Semi-finals

Heat 1

Heat 2

Heats

Heat 1

Heat 2

Heat 3

References
IAAF results, heats (Archived 2009-09-04)
IAAF results, semi-finals
IAAF results, final

4 x 400 metres relay men
Relays at the World Athletics Championships